Autotrichia is a genus of moths in the family Geometridae described by Prout in 1934.

Species
Autotrichia heterogynoides (Wehrli, 1927)
Autotrichia lysimeles (Prout, 1924)
Autotrichia pellucida (Staudinger, 1899)
Autotrichia solanikovi (Ivinskis & Saldaitis, 2001)

References

Gnophini
Geometridae genera